Proletarsky (masculine), Proletarskaya (feminine), or Proletarskoye (neuter) may refer to:
Proletarsky District (disambiguation), several districts in the countries of the former Soviet Union
Proletarsky Urban Settlement (or Proletarskoye Urban Settlement), several municipal urban settlements in Russia
Proletarsky, Russia (Proletarskaya, Proletarskoye), several inhabited localities in Russia
Proletarskyi (Proletarsky), an urban-type settlement in Luhansk Oblast, Ukraine
Proletarskaya metro station (disambiguation), several metro stations in the cities of the former Soviet Union

See also
Proletarsk
Proletariy
Proletariat (disambiguation)